CommuteAir, is a U.S. regional airline founded in 1989.  Today, CommuteAir operates more than 1600 weekly flights to over 75 U.S. destinations and 3 in Mexico, with Embraer ERJ-145 aircraft, from its bases at Denver, Washington Dulles, and Houston Intercontinental. The company was previously called CommutAir until July 26, 2022, when it legally changed its name by adding an "e".

History 

The airline was established in 1989, with headquarters at Clinton County Airport in Plattsburgh, New York. Operations began on August 1, 1989, as a marketing affiliate of USAir.

The airline changed affiliations to Continental Airlines in January 2000, when US Airways and CommuteAir failed to reach a mutually acceptable extension agreement, and CommuteAir decided not to renew the codeshare agreement. In July 2001, the company announced plans to downsize its fleet and workforce by approximately half and change the route structure of the airline. In early 2002, the company began a "micro-hub" operation based in Albany, New York. At its high point in 2003 and 2004, the hub served 21 cities within the Northeast and Canada with a fleet of Beechcraft 1900s. Service was also provided out of Boston's Logan International Airport to several Northeast cities.

In January 2003, CommuteAir announced an agreement with Continental to feed the latter's Cleveland, Ohio hub. Service commenced on March 16, 2003, serving Kalamazoo, Michigan and Elmira, New York. Two cities were added the following month and by August 2003, CommuteAir served 12 cities from the Cleveland hub.

CommuteAir leased sixteen Bombardier DHC-8-200 aircraft from Horizon Air in 2006. The following year, the Beech 1900s were phased out.

On October 30, 2007, the company moved all remaining operations from Clinton County Airport, due to the closure of the airport. All operations were then conducted out of Cleveland Hopkins International Airport.

On October 2, 2008, the company began operations out of Newark Liberty International Airport, following Continental Airlines plan to adjust to the softening industry.

CommuteAir's pilot group voted for union representation by the Air Line Pilots Association in 2008. That same year, Continental Airlines announced that it would cut flights and more than 3,000 jobs. Subsequently, it was announced that some of CommuteAir's Cleveland flights would be eliminated as part of Continental's cutbacks.

In 2011, following the merger of Continental and United, CommuteAir became a United Express carrier and United Airlines asked CommuteAir to obtain five Bombardier Q300s. Two of the aircraft were allocated to Cleveland services and three aircraft were allocated to Newark services.

In 2012, CommuteAir opened a hub at Washington-Dulles International Airport.

In July 2014, CommuteAir closed its pilot base at Cleveland Hopkins International Airport, after United Airlines withdrew its Cleveland hub. CommuteAir also closed its Cleveland maintenance base, and replaced it with a new maintenance base in Albany, New York.

On November 9, 2015, CommuteAir announced that it has reached an agreement with United Airlines to significantly increase the number of airplanes flown under the United Express brand by adding Embraer ERJ-145 jet operations to the company's existing fleet of Bombardier turbo-prop aircraft.

In July 2016, CommuteAir began commercial service with its inaugural flight on the ERJ-145XR jet from Washington, D.C. to Columbia, SC.

In September 2017, the Q300 was phased out and in January 2018, the DHC-8-200 was phased out, marking the end of turbo-prop operations.

On July 30, 2020, it was announced that United Airlines had decided to end its contract with fellow United Express affiliate ExpressJet and transferred these operations to CommuteAir. CommuteAir became the sole operator of the United Express ERJ-145 fleet.

On September 30, 2020, CommuteAir started servicing United's Houston hub and on March 28, 2021, it began  service out of Denver International Airport. The latter marks the return of the ERJ-145 to the Denver United Express fleet since COVID and the cessation of operations by Trans States Airlines.

On January 19, 2023, hacker maia arson crimew announced it had compromised web servers belonging to CommuteAir and obtained access to flight and personnel scheduling systems, the personal data of airline staff, and a 2019 copy of the US Government No Fly List.

Destinations

Crew bases
Denver, Colorado - Denver International Airport
Washington, D.C. - Washington Dulles International Airport
Houston, Texas - George Bush Intercontinental Airport

Maintenance bases 
 Albany, New York - Albany International Airport
 Houston, Texas - George Bush Intercontinental Airport
 Lincoln, Nebraska - Lincoln Airport

Fleet 

As of March 2023, the CommuteAir fleet includes the following aircraft:

As of January 2020, CommuteAir average fleet age was 15.2 years old.

Historical fleet 
The CommuteAir fleet was once composed entirely of Beechcraft 1900D aircraft, operated for US Airways Express and later for Continental Connection.

CommuteAir operated the final turboprop flight for United Express on Sunday, January 7, 2018.

This flight, UCA4909/C54909 between Syracuse Airport and Dulles Airport was operated by tail number N363PH. It marked the end of an era for both CommuteAir and United Express. The Bombardier DHC-8-200 was subsequently ferried to Roswell International Air Center for retirement.

Beechcraft 1900C
Beechcraft 1900D
Bombardier DHC-8-200
Bombardier Q300

Incidents and accidents

CommuteAir Flight 4821 

On January 3, 1992, CommuteAir Flight 4821, a Beechcraft 1900C operating for USAir Express was flying from Plattsburgh, New York to Newark, New Jersey, with stops in Saranac Lake and Albany in New York, crashed into a wooded mountaintop as it was landing at Adirondack Regional Airport. Of the four people on board (two passengers and two crew), two were killed while the other two sustained serious injuries.

The cause of the crash was determined to be pilot error in establishing a stabilized approach and cross-checking instruments. Factors related to the accident were: weather conditions and possible precipitation static interference, caused by inadequate grounding between the radome and fuselage that could have resulted in unreliable glide slope indications."

CommuteAir Flight 4933 

On March 4, 2019, CommuteAir Flight 4933, operating for United Express, landed off the runway during its second attempt at landing in Presque Isle International Airport.  The left main landing gear was torn from the aircraft and embedded in one of the two rear engines. The accident resulted in a loss of the airframe.  Passengers and crew were evacuated, with three passengers and one crew member requiring treatment for minor injuries. 

The National Transportation Safety Board (NTSB) attributed the accident to confirmation bias which prompted the pilots to continue descending even though they could not see the runway due to snow. Contributing factors were poor decision-making by the captain, fatigue of the first officer, and misalignment of the localizer caused by snow. The NTSB criticized the airline's training practices, as the captain had been promoted to that status despite a history of training failures and disciplinary action. The NTSB also noted that at least six CommuteAir flight crews had noticed the localizer misalignment prior to the accident but none had reported it under the airline's safety program until after the event; one CommuteAir crew had reported the problem to the Federal Aviation Administration beforehand, but the agency did not issue a bulletin because protocol dictated that more than one report was required.

See also 
 Air transportation in the United States

References

External links 

 
 Airline Pilot Central
 ESOP Litigation

Regional Airline Association members
Transportation in Cuyahoga County, Ohio
Airlines established in 1989
American companies established in 1989
Regional airlines of the United States
Airlines based in Ohio
1989 establishments in New York (state)